The Jack Ferguson Award is awarded each year to the top draft pick in the Ontario Hockey League priority selection draft. The trophy is named in honour of Jack Ferguson, a former director of OHL Central Scouting.

Winners
List of OHL first overall draft picks.

Note: # indicates player would later be an NHL first overall draft pick

See also
 List of Canadian Hockey League awards

References

External links
 Ontario Hockey League
 OHL Network - Official Page of the OHL Priority Selection: Jack Ferguson Award

Ontario Hockey League trophies and awards
Awards established in 1981